Abderrahmane Medjadel (born 1 July 1998) is an Algerian professional footballer who plays as a goalkeeper for Algerian Ligue Professionnelle 1 club JS Kabylie.

Club career
Medjadel is a youth product of IS Tighennif, before moving to the academy of ASM Oran. In 2017, he transferred to GC Mascara, where he got his first senior experience in the Algerian Ligue Professionnelle 2. He transferred to Olympique Médéa in 2019, where he helped them get promoted into the Algerian Ligue Professionnelle 1. He made his professional debut with Olympique Médéa in a 0–0 Algerian Ligue Professionnelle 1 tie with Sétif on 26 January 2021.
In 2021, he joined Paradou AC.
In 2022, he joined JS Kabylie.

International career
Medjadel was called up to represent the senior Algeria A' national football team for a friendly in June 2021. He debuted in a friendly 1–0 win over Libera on 17 June 2021.

Honours
Algeria
FIFA Arab Cup: 2021

References

External links
 
 FDB Profile
 LFP.dz Profile

1998 births
Living people
People from Mascara Province
Algerian footballers
Algeria international footballers
Olympique de Médéa players
GC Mascara players
Algerian Ligue Professionnelle 1 players
Algerian Ligue 2 players
Association football goalkeepers
21st-century Algerian people